Parid Dule (born 1969) is an Albanian painter and karate instructor or martial arts trainer who lives and works in Tirana, originating from Përmet Albania. Vivaldi's Four Seasons inspired his latest exhibition in the National Historical Museum (Albania) in April 2011.

Parid is a member of an artist's family, including his uncle sculptor Hektor Dule. Dule is an ex-Champion karate Master. Parid is the winner of many international competitions in karate.

Life 

In 1979 Dule started to exhibit in the House of Pioneers in Tirana every year and was rewarded with many prizes. One of his works was bought as part of the art collection of ex-UN Secretary-General Javier Pérez de Cuéllar, who visited that Albanian capital during that period. In 1994 Dule graduated from the Academy of Arts in Tirana.

See also 

 List of Albanians (Martial artists)
 Modern Albanian art
 List of Albanian painters

References

External links 

 Saatchi Online talks about the artist  Collection of paintings, drawings and graphics Saatchi Gallery, Great Britain, London, 2013. Retrieved on 19 December 2013.
 Directory of Tourism and Promotion in the Municipality of Tirana "The painter Parid Dule opens his personal exhibition" shqiperia.com, Albania, 19 April 2011. Retrieved on 12 December 2013.
 Parid Dule was voted as one of 20 members of the Committee of Karate Federation "Karate/Elections for the President" Albanian Sport 14 January 2013. Retrieved on 12 December 2013.
  Official page
 
 

Albanian artists
Albanian painters
Living people
People from Tirana
Albanian male karateka
1969 births
People from Përmet